Choi Doo-ho (born April 10, 1991, often anglicized to Doo Ho Choi or Dooho Choi),  is a South Korean mixed martial artist who currently competes in the Ultimate Fighting Championship in their Featherweight division.

Background
Choi graduated from Gumi University with a degree in Security.

Mixed martial arts career

DEEP
Choi started getting noticed in the MMA world after making his DEEP debut in June 2010, when he faced Yusuke Kagiyama. Choi lost his Deep debut via split decision. After a short stint on the independent circuit, Choi returned to DEEP in September 2010, facing Atsuhiro Tsuboi. He won by TKO in the first round. He went undefeated in his next fights in MMA, beating various fighters like Mitsuhiro Ishida, Kosuke Omeda, and Nobuhiro Obiya.

Before being released to fight in the UFC, Choi fought for DEEP one last time, on June 15, 2013, when he faced Japanese prospect Shoji Maruyama. He won via TKO in the second round.

Sengoku Raiden Championship
While fighting for DEEP, Choi also signed with Sengoku Raiden Championship. He had his first fight at SRC: Sengoku Raiden Championship 13, when he faced Ikuo Usuda. Choi won via split decision. A few months later, Choi was slated to face Masanori Kanehara at SRC: Sengoku Raiden Championship 15. However, three weeks before the event, Choi suffered an injury and the fight was taken off the card.

Ultimate Fighting Championship
In November 2013, following a nine-fight winning streak, Choi signed a contract to fight with the UFC to compete in their featherweight division.

Choi was scheduled to face Sam Sicilia on May 24, 2014, at UFC 173. However, Choi pulled out of the bout with an injury.

Choi ultimately made his debut when he faced Juan Puig on November 22, 2014, at UFC Fight Night 57. He won the fight via TKO just 18 seconds into the first round.

A rescheduled bout with Sam Sicilia was expected to take place on July 15, 2015, at UFC Fight Night 71. However, Choi pulled out of the fight in late June for undisclosed reasons.

The bout with Sicilia was scheduled a third time and took place on November 28, 2015, at UFC Fight Night 79. Choi won the fight via knockout in the first round.  The win also earned him his first Performance of the Night bonus award.

Choi next faced Thiago Tavares on July 8, 2016, at The Ultimate Fighter 23 Finale. He won the fight via knockout in the first round. The win earned him a Performance of the Night bonus award.

Choi faced Cub Swanson on December 10, 2016, at UFC 206. He lost the fight via unanimous decision. The fight was nominated for Fight of the year by the World MMA Awards and ESPN. Both participants were awarded Fight of the Night. During UFC 273 broadcast in April 2022 it was announced that the fight will be inducted to the UFC Hall of Fame Fight Wing class of 2022.

Choi was briefly linked to a bout with Renan Barão which was expected to take place on April 15, 2017, at UFC on Fox 24. However, as the announcement of the pairing began to circulate, Choi declined the bout, and as a result, Barao is expected to be rescheduled against a different opponent, possibly at another event.

Choi was expected to face Andre Fili on July 29, 2017 at UFC 214. However, Choi pulled out of the fight on June 14 citing an injury and was replaced by promotional newcomer Calvin Kattar.

Choi next faced Jeremy Stephens on January 14, 2018 at UFC Fight Night: Stephens vs. Choi. He lost the fight via TKO in the second round. Both participants were awarded Fight of the Night.

Choi faced Charles Jourdain on December 21, 2019 on UFC on ESPN+ 23. After knocking Jourdain down in the first round, Choi eventually lost the fight via TKO in the second round. Both participants were awarded Fight of the Night awards.

Choi was scheduled to face Danny Chavez on July 31, 2021 at UFC on ESPN 28. However, Choi had to pull out of the bout due to injury.

Returning after a three-year layoff, Choi faced Kyle Nelson on February 4, 2023, at UFC Fight Night 218. After a point deduction in the third round due to a headbutt, the fight ended in a majority draw. 9 out of 11 media outlets scored the fight as a win for Choi.

Personal life 
Choi married his wife in 2017 and divorced in 2021.

Championships and achievements

Mixed martial arts
Ultimate Fighting Championship
Performance of the Night (Two times) vs. Sam Sicilia and Thiago Tavares
Fight of the Night (Three times) vs. Cub Swanson, Jeremy Stephens, and Charles Jourdain
2016 Fight of the Year vs. Cub Swanson
UFC Hall of Fame (Fight Wing) vs. 
World MMA Awards
Fight of the Year (2016) vs. Cub Swanson at UFC 206
ESPN
Fight of the Year (2016) vs. Cub Swanson 
MMADNA.nl
2016 Fight of the Year.vs. Cub Swanson

Filmography

Television shows

Mixed martial arts record

|-
|Draw
|align=center|
|Kyle Nelson
|Draw (majority)
|UFC Fight Night: Lewis vs. Spivak
|
|align=center|3
|align=center|5:00
|Las Vegas, Nevada, United States
|
|-
|Loss
|align=center|14–4
|Charles Jourdain
|TKO (punches)
|UFC Fight Night: Edgar vs. The Korean Zombie 
|
|align=center|2
|align=center|4:32
|Busan, South Korea  
|
|-
|Loss
|align=center|14–3
|Jeremy Stephens
|TKO (elbows and punches)
|UFC Fight Night: Stephens vs. Choi
|
|align=center|2
|align=center|2:36
|St. Louis, Missouri, United States
|
|-
|Loss
|align=center|14–2
|Cub Swanson
|Decision (unanimous)
|UFC 206
|
|align=center|3
|align=center|5:00
|Toronto, Ontario, Canada
|
|-
| Win
| align=center|14–1
| Thiago Tavares
| KO (punches)
| The Ultimate Fighter: Team Joanna vs. Team Cláudia Finale
| 
| align=center|1
| align=center|2:42
| Las Vegas, Nevada, United States
| 
|-
| Win
| align=center| 13–1
| Sam Sicilia
| KO (punches)
| UFC Fight Night: Henderson vs. Masvidal
| 
| align=center| 1
| align=center| 1:33
| Seoul, South Korea
| 
|-
| Win
| align=center| 12–1
| Juan Puig
| TKO (punches)
| UFC Fight Night: Edgar vs. Swanson
| 
| align=center| 1
| align=center| 0:18
| Austin, Texas, United States
| 
|-
| Win
| align=center| 11–1
| Shoji Maruyama
| TKO (punches)
| Deep: Cage Impact 2013
| 
| align=center| 2
| align=center| 2:33
| Tokyo, Japan
| 
|-
| Win
| align=center| 10–1
| Tatsunao Nagakura
| TKO (corner stoppage)
| Deep: 61 Impact
| 
| align=center| 2
| align=center| 4:14
| Tokyo, Japan
| 
|-
| Win
| align=center| 9–1
| Kosuke Umeda
| KO (punch)
| Deep: 59 Impact
| 
| align=center| 1
| align=center| 2:49
| Tokyo, Japan
| 
|-
| Win
| align=center| 8–1
| Mitsuhiro Ishida
| KO (knee and punches)
| Deep / Smash: Japan MMA League 2011 Semifinals
| 
| align=center| 1
| align=center| 1:33
| Tokyo, Japan
| 
|-
| Win
| align=center| 7–1
| Nobuhiro Obiya
| KO (flying knee)
| Deep: Cage Impact 2011 in Tokyo, 2nd Round
| 
| align=center| 3
| align=center| 0:15
| Tokyo, Japan
| 
|-
| Win
| align=center| 6–1
| Hisaki Hiraishi
| Decision (unanimous)
| Gladiator: Gladiator 23
| 
| align=center| 2
| align=center| 5:00
| Hiroshima, Japan
| 
|-
| Win
| align=center| 5–1
| Atsuhiro Tsuboi
| TKO (punches)
| Deep: clubDeep Nagoya: Kobudo Fight
| 
| align=center| 1
| align=center| 4:53
| Nagoya, Japan
| 
|-
| Win
| align=center| 4–1
| Yuichiro Ono
| TKO (punches)
| Gladiator: Gladiator 7
| 
| align=center| 1
| align=center| 0:26
| Sapporo, Japan
| 
|-
| Win
| align=center| 3–1
| Ikuo Usuda
| Decision (split)
| World Victory Road Presents: Sengoku Raiden Championships 13
| 
| align=center| 3
| align=center| 5:00
| Tokyo, Japan
|
|-
| Loss
| align=center| 2–1
| Yusuke Kagiyama
| Decision (split)
| Deep: Cage Impact 2010 in Osaka
| 
| align=center| 2
| align=center| 5:00
| Osaka, Japan
| 
|-
| Win
| align=center| 2–0 
| Lee Jong-wha
| TKO (punches)
| M-1 Selection 2010: Asia Round 1
| 
| align=center| 1
| align=center| 3:20
| Seoul, South Korea
| 
|-
| Win
| align=center| 1–0 
| Takashi Matsuoka
| Submission (armbar)
| Grachan: Grachan 3
| 
| align=center| 1
| align=center| 1:05
| Tokyo, Japan
|

See also
 List of current UFC fighters
 List of male mixed martial artists

References

External links
  
 

Living people
1991 births
South Korean male mixed martial artists
South Korean practitioners of Brazilian jiu-jitsu
People from Gumi, North Gyeongsang
Featherweight mixed martial artists
Lightweight mixed martial artists
Mixed martial artists utilizing Brazilian jiu-jitsu
Ultimate Fighting Championship male fighters
Sportspeople from North Gyeongsang Province